Iva Stewart (1914–1985) was an American model and film actress. She was Miss Maine, and competed in Miss America 1933.

Stewart moved to Hollywood where she had a mixture of supporting roles and more minor appearances in glamorous roles in studio films. Amongst her appearances was in the 20th Century Fox series film Mr. Moto Takes a Vacation.

Filmography

References

Bibliography
 Youngkin, Stephen. The Lost One: A Life of Peter Lorre. University Press of Kentucky, 2005.

External links

1914 births
1985 deaths
American film actresses
Female models from New Hampshire
People from Berlin, New Hampshire
20th-century American actresses